The Portugal national baseball team is the national baseball team of Portugal. The team represents Portugal in international competitions. Baseball is still a relatively unknown sport in Portugal. Many of the Portuguese baseball players are from Portuguese communities in Canada, United States and Venezuela.
The first Portuguese baseball stadium, Estádio Municipal de Abrantes, was inaugurated on 22 July 2006.

Portugal was involved in the 2010 European Baseball Championship qualifier tournament, in Abrantes, with Ireland, Greece and Russia. On 9 July 2008, the Portuguese team beat Ireland by 11-8, but lost to Greece by 3-11 at 11 July, and to Russia by 0-10, at 11 July, being eliminated.

See also 
 Portugal baseball League

External links
Official Site of the Portuguese Baseball Federation

Baseball in Portugal
Baseball
National baseball teams in Europe